Baxt is a city in Sirdaryo District of Sirdaryo Region in Uzbekistan. The estimated population in 1968 was 9,100, and 17,500 in 2016.

History
Baxt was founded in 1899 as a settlement serving the passing loop #121 on the Central Asian Railway which connected Samarkand and Tashkent. In 1916, the passing loop was upgraded to a railway station. The station was named Velikoalexeyevskaya after the Russian prince Alexey, the apparent heir to the throne. In 1963, the settlement and the station were renamed Baxt (بخت which means "Happiness" in Persian). In 1980, Baxt was granted town status.

Economy

Industry
As of the 1970s, in Baxt there were a construction materials plant and a cotton purification factory.

Transportation
Baxt has a railway station on a railway connecting Tashkent and Samarkand via Guliston. The M34 highway connecting Tashkent and Dushanbe passes through Baxt as well. There are also local roads.

References

Populated places in Sirdaryo Region
Populated places established in 1899
Cities in Uzbekistan